Helen Gladstone (28 August 1849 – 19 August 1925) was a British educationist, vice-principal at Newnham College in Cambridge, and co-founder of the Women's University Settlement.

Life
Gladstone was born in London. Helen came to notice when her sister Mary proposed that she should become one of the first students to study at Newnham College in Cambridge. In 1877, aged 28 Helen attended Newnham College as one of 25 students. She decided to not take the tripos but she did pass the higher examination.

After completing her course, Gladstone became the assistant to the first principal Anne Clough, an early English Suffragist. Gladstone later became vice principal of Newnham, after Nora Sidgwick in 1892.  At Newnham Helen was known for her sweetness of disposition and good sense, as well as telling anecdotes that frequently mentioned her father.

In 1886, Gladstone turned down the chance to be the first principal of Royal Holloway College but she suspected that they just wanted "a Gladstone." During the 1890s, Helen and her sisters took turns as the ‘daughter at home’ to take care of their aging and increasingly frail parents, and in 1896, she regretfully decided to step down from her post at Newnham and move back to the family home for the reminder of her parents' lives. Both of her parents had died by 1900.

Inspired by Henrietta Barnett and the work of Toynbee Hall (founded in 1884), in 1887 a number of women from Girton and Newnham Colleges at Cambridge University, Lady Margaret and Somerville Colleges at Oxford University and Bedford and Royal Holloway Universities, including Helen Gladstone, Octavia Hill, and Alice Gruner, co-founded the Women's University Settlement.  The Women's University Settlement was founded with the aim to "promote the welfare of the poorer districts of London, more especially of the women and children, by devising and advancing schemes which tend to elevate them, and by giving them additional opportunities in education and recreation".   Formed as part of the Settlement Movement, a social reform movement 'based on the idea that middle class people (settlers) would live among the working poor as moral and intellectual guiding exemplars, rather than provide mere financial support through charity work', women from London colleges were invited to live at the Settlement at 44 Nelson Square, in Southwark.

In 1901 Helen Gladstone became the second Warden of the Blackfriars Settlement, succeeding Margaret Sewell. While dedicated to the Settlement's objectives, She found the organisational side of the Warden's position far less congenial, and stood down after five years.

In 1922 her former lady's maid, Auguste Schlüter, who had kept contact with the Gladstone family published her memoirs. 

Gladstone died in Hawarden in 1925.

Family 
Helen Gladstone was the sixth of eight children of Catherine Gladstone (nee Glynne) and William Ewart Gladstone, the Liberal politician and four time British prime minister.

References 

1849 births
1925 deaths
Academics from London
Women academic administrators
Alumni of Newnham College, Cambridge
British academic administrators